The Promised Land is a 1975 Polish drama film directed by Andrzej Wajda, based on a novel by Władysław Reymont. Set in the industrial city of Łódź, The Promised Land tells the story of a Pole, a German, and a Jew struggling to build a factory in the raw world of 19th-century capitalism.

Wajda presents a shocking image of the city, with its dirty and dangerous factories and ostentatiously opulent residences devoid of taste and culture. The film follows in the footsteps of Charles Dickens, Émile Zola and Maxim Gorky, as well as German expressionists such as Knopf, Meidner and Grosz, who gave testimony of social protest.

In the 2015 poll conducted by the Polish Museum of Cinematography in Łódź, The Promised Land was ranked first on the list of the greatest Polish films of all time.

Plot
Karol Borowiecki (Daniel Olbrychski), a young Polish nobleman, is the managing engineer at the Bucholz textile factory. He is ruthless in his career pursuits, and unconcerned with the long tradition of his financially declined family. He plans to set up his own factory with the help of his friends Max Baum (Andrzej Seweryn), a German and heir to an old handloom factory, and Moritz Welt (Wojciech Pszoniak), an independent Jewish businessman. Borowiecki's affair with Lucy Zucker (Kalina Jędrusik), the wife of another textile magnate, gives him advance notice of a change in cotton tariffs and helps Welt to make a killing on the Hamburg futures market. However, more money has to be found so all three characters cast aside their pride to raise the necessary capital.

On the day of the factory opening, Borowiecki has to deny his affair with Zucker's wife to a jealous husband who, himself a Jew, makes him swear on a sacred Catholic object. Borowiecki then accompanies Lucy on her exile to Berlin. However, Zucker sends an associate to spy on his wife; he confirms the affair and informs Zucker, who takes his revenge on Borowiecki by burning down his brand new, uninsured factory. Borowiecki and his friends lose all that they had worked for.

The film fast forwards a few years. Borowiecki recovered financially by marrying Mada Müller, a rich heiress, and he owns his own factory. His factory is threatened by a workers' strike. Borowiecki is forced to decide whether or not to open fire on the striking and demonstrating workers, who throw a rock into the room where Borowiecki and others are gathered. He is reminded by an associate that it is never too late to change his ways. Borowiecki, who has never shown human compassion toward his subordinates, authorizes the police to open fire nevertheless.

Selected cast

Production
The orgy scene in the garden of Kessler's palace featured female textile workers as extras. And because it was cold, they were 'warmed up' with a little alcohol. "They were so into the atmosphere that they undressed more than they should have," recalled Andrzej Halinski, 2nd stage designer.

Parts of the film were filmed at the Villa of "Cotton King" Karl Wilhelm Scheibler.

Awards
At the 9th Moscow International Film Festival in 1975, the film won the Golden Prize. It was also nominated for the Academy Award for Best Foreign Language Film.

See also
 Cinema of Poland
 List of Polish language films
 List of submissions to the 48th Academy Awards for Best Foreign Language Film
 List of Polish submissions for the Academy Award for Best Foreign Language Film

Footnotes

Sources 
Niemitz, Dorota. 2014. The legacy of postwar Polish filmmaker Andrzej Munk. World Socialist Web Site. 13 October, 2014. https://www.wsws.org/en/articles/2014/10/13/munk-o13.html Retrieved 08 July, 2022.

Further reading

External links

1975 films
1975 drama films
Polish drama films
1970s Polish-language films
Films about businesspeople
Films based on Polish novels
Films set in factories
Films set in Łódź
Films directed by Andrzej Wajda
Films scored by Wojciech Kilar